Gurbachan Singh Dhingra is an Indian entrepreneur, promoter and  vice chairman of Berger Paints. Gurbachan is among the 100 Richest Indian and Forbes global billionaires.

Early life
Gurbachan born (1950) in a business family. His grandfather has started the paint business in 1898 in Amritsar in Sikh Punjabi Family. Gurbachan holds a bachelor's degree from Delhi University.

Berger Paints
In 1991 Gurbachan along with his brother Kuldip Singh Dhingra purchased Berger paints from UB group of Vijay Mallya.

Association
Gurbachan serves as director of Anshana properties, Arambol properties, Citland commercial credits, Lobelia buildwell, Scorpio research and consultants, Vinu estates, Vignette investments, UK Paints, Berger becker coatings, Berger paints, Jolly properties, Rakesh estate, Rakesh containers, Reshma properties,  Rishkul properties, Creative reattach, Kaydee farms, Malibu estate, bigg investments and finance, Flex properties, Burgeon properties, Britona properties, Emvee horticulture, Pagoda builcon, Fable propbuild, Flume propbuild, Valerian Hospitality and Hotels.

Family
Gurbachan is married and has three children. Gurbachan's son Kanwardeep is part of the business. The entire family lives in New Delhi.

References

Living people
People from New Delhi
Indian industrialists
Indian billionaires
Businesspeople from Delhi
1950 births